Little Suamico is an unincorporated community located in the town of Little Suamico, Oconto County, Wisconsin, United States. Little Suamico has a post office with ZIP code 54141.

References

Unincorporated communities in Oconto County, Wisconsin
Unincorporated communities in Wisconsin